Creager is a surname. Notable people with the surname include: 

Angela N. H. Creager (born 1963), American biochemist, and historian of science
Charles E. Creager (1873–1964), American newspaper publisher and politician
Curtis Creager, American-Canadian bass guitarist
Melora Creager (born 1966), American musician
Ronnie Creager (born 1974), American skateboarder 
Roger Creager (born 1971), American country singer and songwriter